The PDC World Youth Championship is a darts tournament organised by the Professional Darts Corporation (PDC), for darts players aged between 16 and 23. The tournament was introduced in 2010 as the PDC Under-21 World Championship and is sponsored by darts manufacturer Unicorn.

The whole tournament is not broadcast live on TV, but the final was played before the final of the Premier League Darts from 2012 until 2014 and is now played before the final game of the Players Championships Finals tournament since 2015. The 2 finalists will earn a spot in the Grand Slam of Darts, and the winner receives a spot in the next PDC World Championship.

The inaugural final was won by Arron Monk, who defeated Michael van Gerwen on January 3, 2011.

Age limits
The first editions were open to players aged 14 to 21 on 1 January of the competition's year. In 2014 the minimum age was increased to 16 and in 2015 the maximum age was increased to 23. Thus instead of an Under-21 or Under-23 championship the general term 'youth' is usually used.

Final results

References

 
World Youth Championship
World championships in darts
World youth sports competitions
International sports competitions hosted by England
Recurring sporting events established in 2011
2011 establishments in England
Annual sporting events